Fernando Juan Fitz-James Stuart y de Solís, 17th Duke of Huéscar, GE (born 14 September 1990), is a Spanish aristocrat. He is the current Duke of Huéscar, and heir apparent to the dukedom of Alba and thereby to the headship of the House of Alba.

Life and family
He was born in Madrid and is the elder son of Carlos Fitz-James Stuart, 19th Duke of Alba (born 2 October 1948), and Matilde de Solís-Beaumont y Martínez-Campos (born in Navarre, Spain, 13 June 1963). On 1 February 2016, he received the title of Duke of Huéscar (the traditional title of the heir to the House of Alba since the 16th century), which title was ceded by his father. He is also a direct descendant of James II of England.

He studied in Madrid at The College for International Studies, where he met his future wife. He married his longtime girlfriend Sofía Palazuelo Barroso, daughter of Fernando Palazuelo and Sofía Barroso, on 6 October 2018 at Liria Palace in a ceremony attended by Queen Sofía of Spain, King Simeon II of Bulgaria and Princess Anne, Duchess of Calabria.

On 8 September 2020 they had a daughter, named Rosario, born at Hospital de Nuestra Señora del Rosario, in Madrid. She was baptized on 29 May 2021 in the Church of San Román (Seville). She received the names of Rosario Matilde Sofía Cayetana Dolores Teresa.

On 10 January 2023, their second child, a daughter named Sofía, was born at Hospital de Nuestra Señora del Rosario, in Madrid.

Ancestry

Fernando’s patriline is the line from which he is descended father to son.
Patrilineal descent is the principle behind membership in Ducal Houses, as it can be traced back through the generations - which means that Fernando’s historically accurate House name is Irujo.
Juan Martínez de Irujo
Martín Martínez de Irujo y Tavar, born 1613
Juan Martínez de Irujo y Mearín, born 1648
Francisco Martínez de Irujo y Éspoz, born 1678
Manuel Martínez de Irujo y de Erice, born 1718
Carlos Martínez de Irujo, 1st Marquess of Casa Irujo, 1763–1824
Carlos Martínez de Irujo, 2nd Marquess of Casa Irujo, 1803–1855
Carlos Martínez de Irujo, 8th Duke of Sotomayor, 1846–1909
Pedro Martínez de Irujo, 9th Duke of Sotomayor, 1882–1957
Luis Martínez de Irujo y Artázcoz, 1919–1972
Carlos Fitz-James Stuart, 19th Duke of Alba,  1948
Fernando Fitz-James Stuart, 17th Duke of Huéscar,  1990

Titles, styles, honours and arms

Titles

Dukedoms
17th Duke of Huéscar, Grandee of Spain

Styles
 1990–2016: The Most Excellent Don Fernando Fitz-James Stuart y de Solís
 2016–present: The Most Excellent The Duke of Huéscar

Honours

Arms

References

|-

Living people
1990 births
Nobility from Madrid
Dukes of Huéscar
Fernando
Grandees of Spain